Government formation is the process in a parliamentary system of selecting a prime minister and cabinet members.  If no party controls a majority of seats, it can also involve deciding which parties will be part of a coalition government.  It usually occurs after an election, but can also occur after a vote of no confidence in an existing government.

Delays or failures in forming a government 
A failure to form a government is a type of cabinet crisis where a coalition controlling a majority of seats cannot be agreed upon.

The process of government formation can sometimes be lengthy. For example, following the 2013 German federal election, Germany engaged in 85 days of government formation negotiations, the longest in the nation's post-war history. The outcome was the third Merkel cabinet, another grand coalition led by Angela Merkel.

Belgium 
Belgian governments are typically coalition governments due to the split between the Flemish and French parts of the country. On occasion, this has led to a situation where no party is able to form a government but the Parliament does not vote to return to the polls.  This occurred most notably in 2010–11, when Belgium operated without a government for 541 days. Though there were calls for drastic measures to resolve the issue, including via a partition of Belgium, government services were not disrupted due to the implementation of a caretaker government and the devolution of most key functions.

See also 
 Formateur
 Dutch cabinet formation

References 

 
Beginnings